A Pre-existing Condition is the ninth album by American folk rock musician David Dondero, released on February 22, 2011 by Ghostmeat Records. It came eight years after his third release with Ghostmeat, Spider West Myshkin and a City Bus.

Track listing
 Willin' – 2:14
 Not Everybody Loves Your Doggie Like You Do – 2:41
 Freight Train – 2:01
 Kiss An Angel Good Mornin' – 2:47
 Don't Cry No Tears – 2:38
 Please Hand Me Over to the Undertaker 3:37
 Pretty Boy Floyd – 3:46 
 (Is Anybody Going To) San Antone – 2:47 
 Boxcar – 2:00
 Song For Buck Owens – 2:23
 Let Me Die in My Footsteps – 3:41
 T For Texas – 2:59
 A Pre-Existing Condition – 4:31

External links
 http://www.ghostmeat.com/daviddondero.html

David Dondero albums
2011 albums